Farmers Bank of Fredericksburg, also known as The National Bank of Fredericksburg, is a historic bank building located at Fredericksburg, Virginia. It was built in 1819–20, and is a -story, rectangular red-brick building in the Federal style. It features a slate-covered front gable roof with a lunette window in the front pediment, wide cornice, three pairs of brick chimneys, and engaged pedestal columns with full entablature on the front facade.  The front portion of the main floor had been used as a banking house since its construction, while the rooms at the rear and those on the second floor housed the bank's cashiers and their families from 1820 to 1920. In 2016, after completing renovations to the inside of the building, the building was converted into a restaurant while keeping the existing bank vault as a private dining area.

It was listed on the National Register of Historic Places in 1983.

References

External links
National Bank Building, George Street & Princess Ann Street, Fredericksburg, Fredericksburg, VA: 2 photos and 1 photo caption page at Historic American Buildings Survey

Historic American Buildings Survey in Virginia
Bank buildings on the National Register of Historic Places in Virginia
Federal architecture in Virginia
Commercial buildings completed in 1820
Buildings and structures in Fredericksburg, Virginia
National Register of Historic Places in Fredericksburg, Virginia